Jerry Keeling (August 2, 1939 – January 20, 2018) was a quarterback and defensive back in the Canadian Football League, playing fifteen seasons from 1961 to 1975 for the Calgary Stampeders, the Ottawa Rough Riders, and the Hamilton Tiger-Cats. For his great play, he became a member of the Canadian Football Hall of Fame in 1989.

Calgary Stampeders
The Paris, Texas-born Enid, Oklahoma-reared Keeling was a member of the Stampeders from 1961 to 1972, playing defensive back and quarterback positions. It was only in 1969 that Keeling became the starting quarterback. Keeling was the winning quarterback in the 1970 Western Conference finals in a best of 3 series against the Saskatchewan Roughriders, the final game in brutally cold weather (see video clip below) won by Calgary by a score of 15–14, one of the coldest football games ever.

But the team lost the 58th Grey Cup game played on a very muddy field to the Montreal Alouettes. However, after beating Saskatchewan again in the Western Conference finals in 1971, he beat the Toronto Argonauts during the rainy 59th Grey Cup game, his first championship victory.

Ottawa Rough Riders
Keeling became an Ottawa Rough Rider from 1973 to 1975. In 1973, he was their starting quarterback and led his team to the 61st Grey Cup. However, he was replaced by Rick Cassata in the title game because of an injury. Ottawa won that game, Keeling's second and last Grey Cup win.

Hamilton Tiger-Cats
He ended his career in 1975 as the starting quarterback of the Hamilton Tiger-Cats, which finished 5-10-1 yet made the playoffs, though defeated on the first round by the Alouettes.

Coaching 

Keeling was an assistant coach for the Stampeders from 1982 to 1983.

Death
Keeling died on Saturday, January 20, 2018. At the time of his death he was living in Oklahoma with his wife Vella.

References

External links

1939 births
2018 deaths
People from Paris, Texas
Sportspeople from Texas
American players of Canadian football
Calgary Stampeders players
Canadian football defensive backs
Canadian Football Hall of Fame inductees
Canadian football quarterbacks
Hamilton Tiger-Cats players
Ottawa Rough Riders players
Players of American football from Oklahoma
Tulsa Golden Hurricane football players
Sportspeople from Enid, Oklahoma
Enid High School alumni